Vojin Ćaćić (born ) is a Montenegrin male volleyball player. He is a captain of the Montenegro men's national volleyball team.

Sporting achievements

CEV Cup
 2008  2007–08 Men's CEV Cup, with Budvanska Rivijera Budva
 2018  2017–18 Men's CEV Cup, with Ziraat Bankası Ankara

AVC Club Volleyball Championship
 2016  2016 Asian Men's Club Volleyball Championship, with Sarmayeh Bank Tehran

Club titles
 2008  Montenegrin Championship, with Budvanska Rivijera Budva
 2009  Montenegrin Championship, with Budvanska Rivijera Budva
 2010  Montenegrin Championship, with Budvanska Rivijera Budva
 2010  Montenegrin Cup, with Budvanska Rivijera Budva
 2011  Montenegrin Championship, with Budvanska Rivijera Budva
 2011  Montenegrin Cup, with Budvanska Rivijera Budva
 2012  Montenegrin Championship, with Budvanska Rivijera Budva
 2012  Montenegrin Cup, with Budvanska Rivijera Budva
 2013  Montenegrin Championship, with Budvanska Rivijera Budva
 2017  Iranian Championship, with Sarmayeh Bank Tehran
 2020  Greek League Cup, with Panathinaikos
 2020  Greek Championship, with Panathinaikos

National team
 2014  Men's European Volleyball League

References

External links
 Player profile at FIVB.org
 Player profile at WorldofVolley.com

1990 births
Living people
Montenegrin men's volleyball players
Place of birth missing (living people)
Panathinaikos V.C. players